Haßberge may refer to:

 Haßberge, a chain of hills the district is named after
 Haßberge (district), a district in Bavaria, Germany
 Haßberge Nature Park, a park in the area